Keep It in the Family may refer to:

Books and theatre
 Keep It in the Family, a 1967 play by Bill Naughton
 Keep It in the Family, a 1996 children's book by Anne Fine

Film and television
 Keep It in the Family (film), a 1973 film starring John Gavin
 Keep It in the Family (1971 TV series), a 1971 British television comedy
 Keep It in the Family (1980 TV series), a 1980s British sitcom
 Keep It in the Family (British game show), a 2010s British game show
 Keep It in the Family (American game show), a 1950s American game show

Music
Keep it in the Family, a 1974 album by Leon Haywood, and the title track
"Keep It In The Family", a 1982 song by  Deodato from  Happy Hour
"Keep It in the Family", a 1990 song by  Anthrax from Persistence of Time
"Keep It in the Family", a 2006 song by  Hybrid from I Choose Noise